Catmose College is a secondary academy school on Huntsmans Drive in Oakham, Rutland. The catchment area covers the county town of Oakham and surrounding villages, although students are drawn from a wider area through parental choice. From 1972 until 2009 the school name was Vale of Catmose College.

In 2009 the college, in partnership with Rutland County Council started construction of a £23m new campus which opened in 2011. The new building, designed by Jonathan Ellis Miller, combines a 900 pupil academy, Sure Start centre, sports building, outdoor pitches, and a learning disability resource centre.

In 2010, Catmose College federated with Southfield Community Primary School which became Catmose Primary. The addition of Catmose Nursery in 2012 means that Catmose Federation provides for children from 3 months to 16 years.

Catmose College specialises in Visual Arts. The Catmose Gallery, opened in May 2003 by the Department for Culture, Media and Sport, was the first public art gallery located in a community college.  The gallery provided students and the public with a programme of high calibre national, local and student exhibitions before in July 2011 the college governors decided on the closure of the gallery to the public.

With 90% of students achieving five GCSE grades A*-C the college is one of highest attaining in Rutland and Leicestershire. The Ofsted report in February 2012 rated the College  'Outstanding' in all 4 categories and overall.

History 

 1920 – Oakham Central School
 1937 – Secondary Modern School
 1946 – Oakham County Secondary School	
 1962 – Vale of Catmose Village College
 1968 – New classroom block erected
 1972 – Vale of Catmose College
 1974 – New language department with language laboratory
 1976 – New library and new science block
 1981 – New Swimming Pool
 2003 – Art Gallery
 2006 – Announcement of rebuild as part of Government's Building Schools for the Future programme
 2007 – Swimming pool refurbished
 2009 – Catmose College
 2010 – Southfield Community Primary School entered a federation with Catmose College and changed its name to Catmose Primary
 2011 – Moved to new campus
 2011 – Became an academy
 2011 – Closure of Catmose Gallery
 2012 – Graded 'Outstanding' by Ofsted in all 4 categories and overall

Facilities
The Catmose Sports Centre includes a gym, 2 dance studios, 8 court sports hall, floodlit synthetic pitch, netball & tennis courts and coffee house plus the existing 25-metre swimming pool which was refurbished in 2007. There is also the Catmose Gallery and the Catmose Theatre. 
 
Catmose College is a technology-led facility and offers a range of devices for student use. PCs are located throughout the college building and each student is given a unique login to give them access to the machines at any time during the day. Available from the library, students are able to borrow a range of fiction and non-fiction books, iPads, laptops, digital cameras, broadcast quality video cameras, audio recorders and microphones.

Within the music department there is a Pro Tools equipped multitrack recording studio complete with a live and control room. There are 5 practice rooms for student use including Yamaha pianos, guitar amps and a set of Roland V Drums.

The college theatre is equipped with professional grade sound, light and AV equipment. It is used for presentations, assemblies and College productions. Recent productions have included Hairspray the musical and Alice in Wonderland.

Sports

Sport at Catmose is integrated within the college's core curriculum, as an examination subject, and as a key component of the extracurricular opportunities available.

Each student participates in two physical education lessons per week, and has the opportunity to study GCSE PE or BTEC Sport in years 10 and 11.

The college offers over twenty five sports throughout the academic year through core physical education, extracurricular sport, the electives programme and examination PE.

Music
Student participation in the extra-curricular programme is around a hundred students and the range of activities on offer is extensive and includes a Chamber Choir for higher-ability students, a Samba Band for the percussionists to practice ensemble skills, a classical guitar group and a recorder club.

These groups perform for the college and wider community throughout the year, highlights include five lunch recitals at the church, eleven recitals in the Gallery, a joint concert in the Museum with students from Uppingham Community College and Oakham School, and various Performing Arts tours to countries such as the Netherlands, Belgium, France and Germany.

Electives
The Catmose College electives programme forms a central part of the extra-curricular and enrichment life of the college. All students at the college elect to take short courses that take place on Wednesday afternoons from 12:45 to 2:15 pm. They are led by college staff and visiting tutors. 
 
Electives run at different times during the year and there are compulsory courses that students are required to follow. In year 7 the compulsory course takes place in term 1 and contains a range of sessions designed to smooth the transition from primary to secondary school.

School uniform
 White shirt with full length sleeves worn with school tie
 Black jumper with Catmose College logo (a grey jumper for year 11 pupils is optional)
 Black leather shoes 
 Black trousers or a black College skirt
 Black Blazer with Catmose College logo

The full Catmose College uniform policy can be found on the College website

Harington School
In September 2015 Harington School opened at the Catmose College campus. Harington School is a sixth form provision offering A-level courses for students from the whole of Rutland. It relocated to a new dedicated building next to Catmose College in October 2016.

Notable alumni
Elizabeth Berridge, Baroness Berridge -  politician
Sam Carter - guitarist and songwriter
Tom Marshall - artist and photo colouriser
Nina Sosanya - actress

References

External links
 College website

Academies in Rutland

Educational institutions established in 1920
1920 establishments in England
Secondary schools in Rutland
Articles containing video clips
Oakham